Reijo Mattinen (born 1963) is a Finnish orienteering competitor, three times medalist in the relay at the World Orienteering Championships.

He received a bronze medal in the relay event in 1989, a bronze medal in 1991, and a silver medal in 1995.

See also
 Finnish orienteers
 List of orienteers
 List of orienteering events

References

1963 births
Living people
Finnish orienteers
Male orienteers
Foot orienteers
World Orienteering Championships medalists